David Oliver Allen (1800–1863) was an American missionary to India and an author.

Life
Allen was born in Barre, Massachusetts to Moses and Mahitable Allen.  His father relocated the family to Princeton, Massachusetts while David Allen was an infant.  He initially began collegiate studies at Williams College, but moved to Amherst College upon that institution's opening.  He graduated from Amherst College in 1823 and spent a year teaching in Groton, Massachusetts.  In 1824 he began study at Andover Theological Seminary and completed their course in 1827.  He decided upon missionary work his final year, and was ordinated on May 21.  Seven days later he was married to Myra Wood.  Allen was called to Bombay, India as a missionary before he graduated as the situation there was deemed an emergency.  He arrived in Bombay on November 27, 1827.  His wife accompanied him, but she died on February 5, 1831.  In 1844 he took charge of the Bombay printing establishment. He wrote tracts in "Mahratta," (Marathi language) and supervised a new translation of the Bible into that language. Weakened by the Indian climate, he returned to America in 1853.

His History of India was published at Boston in 1856.
The full title of this book is "India Ancient and Modern. Geographical, Historical, Political, Social, and Religious; with a particular account of the state and prospects of Christianity."

References

1800 births
1863 deaths
Amherst College alumni
19th-century American historians
19th-century American male writers
American Protestant missionaries
Protestant missionaries in India
People from Barre, Massachusetts
Translators of the Bible into Marathi
19th-century translators
American expatriates in India
Andover Theological Seminary alumni
Historians from Massachusetts
Missionary linguists
19th-century American clergy
American male non-fiction writers